Ben l'Oncle Soul is the debut album by French soul singer and songwriter Ben l'Oncle Soul. It was released by Motown Records in 2010.

Track listing

Charts
The album has charted in France and many other charts and was certified three times platinum in France.

Weekly charts

Year-end charts

References

2010 debut albums
Ben l'Oncle Soul albums